Larentia malvata is a moth of the family Geometridae. It was described by Rambur in 1833. It is found in Portugal, Spain, France, Italy, Croatia, Greece, as well as on Sardinia, Corsica, Sicily, Malta and Crete.

The wingspan is 26–31 mm.

The larvae feed on Malva and Lavatera species.

References

Moths described in 1833
Larentiini
Moths of Europe
Taxa named by Jules Pierre Rambur